Frederick Postal was the co-owner of the Washington Senators of the American League with Ban Johnson from  through .  In 1903, Johnson and Postal sold the Senators to Thomas C. Noyes.

References
Minnesota Twins owners

Major League Baseball owners
Washington Senators (1901–1960) owners
Year of birth missing
Year of death missing